Rita Hayworth (born Margarita Carmen Cansino; October 17, 1918May 14, 1987) was an American actress, dancer and producer. She achieved fame during the 1940s as one of the era's top stars, appearing in 61 films over 37 years. The press coined the term "The Love Goddess" to describe Hayworth after she had become the most glamorous screen idol of the 1940s. She was the top pin-up girl for GIs during World War II.

Hayworth is perhaps best known for her performance in the 1946 film noir Gilda, opposite Glenn Ford, in which she played the femme fatale in her first major dramatic role. She is also known for her performances in Only Angels Have Wings (1939), The Strawberry Blonde (1941), Blood and Sand (1941), The Lady from Shanghai (1947), Pal Joey (1957), and Separate Tables (1958). Fred Astaire, with whom she made two films, You'll Never Get Rich (1941) and You Were Never Lovelier (1942), once called her his favorite dance partner. She also starred in the Technicolor musical Cover Girl (1944), with Gene Kelly. She is listed as one of the top 25 female motion picture stars of all time in the American Film Institute's survey, AFI's 100 Years...100 Stars.

In 1980, Hayworth was diagnosed with early-onset Alzheimer's disease, which contributed to her death in 1987 at age 68. The public disclosure and discussion of her illness drew attention to Alzheimer's, and helped to increase public and private funding for research into the disease.

Early life

Hayworth was born as Margarita Carmen Cansino in Brooklyn, New York, the oldest child of two dancers. Her father, Eduardo Cansino, was of Romani descent from Castilleja de la Cuesta, a little town near Seville, Spain.

Her mother, Volga Hayworth, was an American of Irish and English descent who had performed with the Ziegfeld Follies. The couple married in 1917. They also had two sons: Eduardo Jr. and Vernon. Her maternal uncle Vinton Hayworth was also an actor.

Margarita's father wanted her to become a professional dancer, while her mother hoped she would become an actress. Her paternal grandfather, Antonio Cansino, was renowned as a classical Spanish dancer. He popularized the bolero, and his dancing school in Madrid was world-famous. Antonio Cansino instructed Rita Hayworth's first dance lesson. Hayworth later recalled, "From the time I was three and a half ... as soon as I could stand on my own feet, I was given dance lessons." She noted "I didn't like it very much ... but I didn't have the courage to tell my father, so I began taking the lessons. Rehearse, rehearse, rehearse, that was my girlhood."

She attended dance classes every day for a few years in a Carnegie Hall complex, where she was taught by her uncle Angel Cansino. Before her fifth birthday she was one of the Four Cansinos featured in the Broadway production of The Greenwich Village Follies at the Winter Garden Theatre. In 1926, at the age of eight, she was featured in La Fiesta, a short film for Warner Bros.

In 1927, her father took the family to Hollywood. He believed that dancing could be featured in the movies and that his family could be part of it. He established his own dance studio, where he taught such stars as James Cagney and Jean Harlow.

In 1931, Eduardo Cansino partnered with his 12-year-old daughter to form an act called the Dancing Cansinos. Her hair was dyed from brown to black to give her a more mature and "Latin" appearance. Since under California law Margarita was too young to work in nightclubs and bars, her father took her with him to work across the border in Tijuana, Mexico. In the early 1930s, it was a popular tourist spot for people from Los Angeles. Because she was working, Cansino never graduated from high school, but she completed the ninth grade at Hamilton High in Los Angeles.

Cansino (Hayworth) took a bit part in the film Cruz Diablo (1934) at age 16, which led to another bit part in the film In Caliente (1935) with the Mexican actress Dolores del Río. She danced with her father in such nightspots as the Foreign and the Caliente clubs. Winfield Sheehan, the head of the Fox Film Corporation, saw her dancing at the Caliente Club and quickly arranged for Hayworth to do a screen test a week later. Impressed by her screen persona, Sheehan signed her for a short-term, six-month contract at Fox, under the name Rita Cansino, the first of two name changes during her film career.

Career

Early career

During her time at Fox, Hayworth was billed as Rita Cansino and appeared in unremarkable roles, often cast as the exotic foreigner. In late 1934, aged 16, she performed a dance sequence in the Spencer Tracy film Dante's Inferno (1935), and was put under contract in February 1935. She had her first speaking role as an Argentinian girl in Under the Pampas Moon (1935). She played an Egyptian girl in Charlie Chan in Egypt (1935), and a Russian dancer in Paddy O'Day (1935). Sheehan was grooming her for the lead in the 1936 Technicolor film Ramona, hoping to establish her as Fox Film's new Dolores del Río.

By the end of her six-month contract, Fox had merged into 20th Century Fox, with Darryl F. Zanuck serving as the executive producer. Dismissing Sheehan's interest in her and giving Loretta Young the lead in Ramona, Zanuck did not renew Cansino's contract. Sensing her screen potential, salesman and promoter Edward C. Judson, with whom she would elope in 1937, got freelance work for her in several small-studio films and a part in the Columbia Pictures feature Meet Nero Wolfe (1936). Studio head Harry Cohn signed her to a seven-year contract and tried her out in small roles.

Cohn argued that her image was too Mediterranean, which limited her to being cast in "exotic" roles that were fewer in number. He was heard to say her last name sounded too Spanish. Judson acted on Cohn's advice: Rita Cansino became Rita Hayworth when she adopted her mother's maiden name, to the consternation of her father. With a name that emphasized Irish-American ancestry, people were more likely to regard her as a classic "American".

With Cohn and Judson's encouragement, Hayworth changed her hair color to dark red and had electrolysis to raise her hairline and broaden the appearance of her forehead.

Hayworth appeared in five minor Columbia pictures and three minor independent movies in 1937. The following year, she appeared in five Columbia B movies. In 1939, Cohn pressured director Howard Hawks to use Hayworth for a small, but important, role as a man-trap in the aviation drama Only Angels Have Wings, in which she played opposite Cary Grant and Jean Arthur.

Cohn began to build up Hayworth in 1940 in features such as Music in My Heart, The Lady in Question, and Angels Over Broadway. That year, she was first featured in a Life magazine cover story. While on loan to Warner Bros., Hayworth appeared as the second female lead in The Strawberry Blonde (1941), opposite James Cagney.

She returned in triumph to Columbia Pictures, and was cast in the musical You'll Never Get Rich (1941) opposite Fred Astaire in one of the highest-budgeted films Columbia had ever made. The picture was so successful, the studio produced and released another Astaire-Hayworth picture the following year, You Were Never Lovelier. Astaire's biographer Peter Levinson writes that the dancing combination of Astaire and Hayworth was "absolute magnetism on the screen". Although Astaire made 10 films with Ginger Rogers, his other main dancing partner, Hayworth's sensuality surpassed Rogers's cool technical expertise. "Rita's youthful exuberance meshed perfectly with Fred's maturity and elegance", says Levinson.

When Astaire was asked who his favorite dance partner was, he tried not answering the question, but later admitted it was Hayworth: "All right, I'll give you a name", he said. "But if you ever let it out, I'll swear I lied. It was Rita Hayworth." Astaire commented that "Rita danced with trained perfection and individuality ... She was better when she was 'on' than at rehearsal." Biographer Charlie Reinhart describes the effect she had on Astaire's style:

In August 1941, Hayworth was featured in an iconic Life photo in which she posed in a negligee with a black lace bodice. Bob Landry's photo made Hayworth one of the top two pin-up girls of the World War II years; the other was Betty Grable, in a 1943 photograph. For two years, Hayworth's photograph was the most requested pin-up photograph in circulation. In 2002, the satin nightgown Hayworth wore for the photo sold for $26,888.

In March 1942, Hayworth visited Brazil as a cultural ambassador for the Roosevelt administration's Good Neighbor policy, under the auspices of the Office of the Coordinator of Inter-American Affairs. During the 1940s Hayworth also contributed to the OCIAA's cultural diplomacy initiatives in support of Pan-Americanism through her broadcasts to South America on the CBS "Cadena de las Américas" radio network.

Peak years at Columbia
Hayworth had top billing in one of her best-known films, the Technicolor musical Cover Girl, released in 1944. The film established her as Columbia's top star of the 1940s, and it gave her the distinction of being the first of only six women to dance on screen with both Gene Kelly and Fred Astaire. "I guess the only jewels of my life", Hayworth said in 1970, "were the pictures I made with Fred Astaire ... And Cover Girl, too."

For three consecutive years, starting in 1944, Hayworth was named one of the top movie box-office attractions in the world. She was adept in ballet, tap, ballroom, and Spanish routines. Cohn continued to showcase Hayworth's dance talents. Columbia featured her in the Technicolor films Tonight and Every Night (1945) with Lee Bowman and Down to Earth (1947) with Larry Parks.

Her sexy, glamorous appeal was most noted in Charles Vidor's film noir Gilda (1946) with Glenn Ford, which caused censors some consternation. The role, in which Hayworth wore black satin and performed a legendary one-glove striptease, "Put The Blame On Mame", made her into a cultural icon as a femme fatale.

While Gilda was in release, it was widely reported that an atomic bomb which was scheduled to be tested at Bikini Atoll in the Pacific Ocean's Marshall Islands would bear an image of Hayworth, a reference to her bombshell status. Although the gesture was undoubtedly meant as a compliment, Hayworth was deeply offended. Orson Welles, then married to Hayworth, recalled her anger in an interview with biographer Barbara Leaming: "Rita used to fly into terrible rages all the time, but the angriest was when she found out that they'd put her on the atom bomb. Rita almost went insane, she was so angry. ... She wanted to go to Washington to hold a press conference, but Harry Cohn wouldn't let her because it would be unpatriotic." Welles tried to persuade Hayworth that the whole business was not a publicity stunt on Cohn's part, that it was simply homage to her from the flight crew.

On the June 30, 1946, broadcast of Orson Welles Commentaries, Welles said of the imminent test, "I want my daughter to be able to tell her daughter that grandmother's picture was on the last atom bomb ever to explode."

The fourth atomic bomb ever to be detonated was decorated with a photograph of Hayworth cut from the June 1946 issue of Esquire magazine. Above it was stenciled the device's nickname, "Gilda", in two-inch black letters.

Hayworth's performance in Welles's 1947 film The Lady from Shanghai was critically acclaimed. The film's failure at the box office was attributed in part to Hayworth's famous red hair being cut short and bleached platinum blonde for the role. Cohn had not been consulted and was furious that Hayworth's image was changed.

Also in 1947, Hayworth was featured in a Life cover story by Winthrop Sargeant that resulted in her being nicknamed "The Love Goddess". The term was adopted and used later as the title of a biopic and of a biography about her. In a 1980s interview, Hayworth said, "Everybody else does nude scenes, but I don't. I never made nude movies. I didn't have to do that. I danced. I was provocative, I guess, in some things. But I was not completely exposed."

Her next film, The Loves of Carmen (1948) with Glenn Ford, was the first film co-produced by Columbia and Hayworth's production company, The Beckworth Corporation (named for Rebecca, her daughter with Welles). It was Columbia's biggest moneymaker that year. She received a percentage of the profits from this and all her subsequent films until 1954, when she dissolved Beckworth to pay off debts.

The Hollywood princess

In 1948, at the height of her fame, Hayworth traveled to Cannes and was introduced to Prince Aly Khan. They began a year-long courtship, and were married on May 27, 1949. Hayworth left Hollywood and sailed for France, breaking her contract with Columbia.

Because Hayworth was already one of the most well-known celebrities in the world, the courtship and the wedding received enormous press coverage around the world. Because she was still legally married to second husband Orson Welles during the early days of her courtship with the prince, Hayworth also received some negative backlash, causing some American fans to boycott her pictures. Their wedding marked the first time a Hollywood actress became a princess. On December 28, 1949, Hayworth gave birth to the couple's only child, Princess Yasmin Aga Khan.

Though Hayworth was anxious to start a new life abroad, away from Hollywood, Aly Khan's flamboyant lifestyle and duties proved too difficult for Hayworth. She struggled to fit in with his friends, and found it difficult to learn French. Aly Khan was also known in circles as a playboy, and it was suspected that he had been unfaithful to Hayworth during the marriage.

In 1951, Hayworth set sail with her two daughters for New York. Although the couple did reconcile for a short time, they divorced in 1953.

Returning to Columbia

After the collapse of her marriage to Khan, Rita Hayworth was forced to return to Hollywood to star in her "comeback" picture, Affair in Trinidad (1952) which again paired her with Glenn Ford. Director Vincent Sherman recalled that Hayworth seemed "rather frightened at the approach of doing another picture". She continued to clash with Columbia boss Harry Cohn and was placed on suspension during filming. Nevertheless, the picture was highly publicized. The picture ended up grossing $1 million more than her previous blockbuster, Gilda.

She continued to star in a string of successful pictures. In 1953, she had two films released: Salome with Charles Laughton and Stewart Granger, and Miss Sadie Thompson with José Ferrer and Aldo Ray. She was off the big screen for another four years, mainly because of a tumultuous marriage to the singer Dick Haymes. During her marriage to Haymes, she was involved in much negative publicity, which significantly lessened her appeal. By the time she returned to the screen for Fire Down Below (1957) with Robert Mitchum and Jack Lemmon, Kim Novak had become Columbia's top female star. Her last musical was Pal Joey (1957) with Frank Sinatra and Novak (Hayworth had top billing in both pictures but actually played a supporting role in Pal Joey). After this film, Hayworth left Columbia for good.

She received good reviews for her performance in Separate Tables (1958), with Burt Lancaster and David Niven, and The Story on Page One (1960). She continued working throughout the 1960s. In 1962, her planned Broadway debut in Step on a Crack was cancelled for undisclosed health reasons. The Money Trap (1964) paired her, for the last time, with good friend Glenn Ford. She continued to act in films until the early 1970s. She made comedic television appearances on Laugh In and The Carol Burnett Show in the 1970s. Her last film was The Wrath of God (1972), a western.

Struggles with Columbia Pictures
Hayworth had a strained relationship with Columbia Pictures for many years. In 1943, she was suspended without pay for nine weeks because she refused to appear in Once Upon a Time. During this period in Hollywood, contract players could not choose their films; they were on salary rather than receiving a fixed amount per picture.

In 1947, Hayworth's new contract with Columbia provided a salary of $250,000 plus 50% of films' profits.
In 1951, Columbia alleged it had $800,000 invested in properties for her, including the film she walked out on that year. Hayworth left Hollywood to marry Prince Aly Khan and was suspended for failing to report to work on the film Affair in Trinidad. In 1952, Hayworth refused to report for work because she objected to the script. She said,

I was in Switzerland when they sent me the script for Affair in Trinidad and I threw it across the room. But I did the picture, and Pal Joey, too. I came back to Columbia because I wanted to work and first, see, I had to finish that goddamn contract, which is how Harry Cohn owned me!"

In 1955, she sued Columbia Pictures to be released from her contract, but asked for her $150,000 salary, alleging that the filming failed to start on Joseph and His Brethren (1961) when agreed, later filmed in 1961 by a foreign company as The Story of Joseph and His Brethren (film).
Cohn had a reputation as a taskmaster, but he had his own criticisms of Hayworth. He had invested heavily in her before she began an affair with the married Aly Khan, and it could have caused a backlash against her career and Columbia's success. For instance, an article in the British periodical The People called for a boycott of Hayworth's films:

Hollywood must be told its already tarnished reputation will sink to rock bottom if it restores this reckless woman to a place among its stars."

Cohn expressed his frustration in a 1957 interview with Time magazine:

Hayworth might be worth ten million dollars today easily! She owned 25% of the profits with her own company and had hit after hit and she had to get married and had to get out of the business and took a suspension because she fell in love again! In five years, at two pictures a year, at 25%! Think of what she could have made! But she didn't make pictures! She took two or three suspensions! She got mixed up with different characters! Unpredictable!"

Years after her film career had ended and long after Cohn had died, Hayworth still resented her treatment by both him and Columbia. She spoke bluntly in a 1968 interview:

I used to have to punch a time clock at Columbia. Every day of my life. That's what it was like. I was under exclusive contract, like they owned me ... I think he had my dressing room bugged ... He was very possessive of me as a person, he didn't want me to go out with anybody, have any friends. No one can live that way. So I fought him ... You want to know what I think of Harry Cohn? He was a monster.

Later on, in 1972 she said :

Harry Cohn thought of me as one of the people he could exploit, and make a lot of money...And I did make a lot of money for him, but not much for me."

Hayworth resented the fact that the studio had failed to train her to sing or even to encourage her to learn how to sing. Although she appeared to sing in many of her films, she was usually dubbed. Because the public did not know her secret, she was embarrassed to be asked to sing by troops at USO shows.

I wanted to study singing", Hayworth complained, "but Harry Cohn kept saying, 'Who needs it?' and the studio wouldn't pay for it. They had me so intimidated that I couldn't have done it anyway. They always said, 'Oh, no, we can't let you do it. There's no time for that; it has to be done right now!' I was under contract, and that was it."

Public image
Hayworth was a top glamour girl in the 1940s, a pin-up girl for military servicemen and a beauty icon for women. She reportedly changed her hair color eight times in eight movies.

In 1949, Hayworth's lips were voted best in the world by the Artists League of America. She had a modeling contract with Max Factor to promote its Tru-Color lipsticks and Pan-Stik make-up.

Personal life

Marriages, relationships and family

Hayworth confided to Orson Welles that her father began to sexually abuse her as a child, when they were touring together as the Dancing Cansinos. Her biographer, Barbara Leaming, wrote that her mother may have been the only person to know; she slept in the same bed as her daughter to try to protect her from incest. Leaming wrote that the abuse experienced by Hayworth as a young girl contributed to her difficulty in relationships as an adult.

In 1941, Hayworth said she was the antithesis of the characters she played: "I naturally am very shy ... and I suffer from an inferiority complex." Her provocative role in Gilda, in particular, was responsible for people expecting her to be what she was not. Hayworth once said, with some bitterness, "Men go to bed with Gilda, but wake up with me." She said, "Basically, I am a good, gentle person, but I am attracted to mean personalities."

Hayworth's two younger brothers, Eduardo Cansino Jr. and Vernon Cansino, both served in World War II. Vernon left the United States Army in 1946 with several medals, including the Purple Heart, and later married Susan Vail, a dancer. Eduardo Jr. followed Hayworth into acting; he was also under contract with Columbia Pictures. In 1950, he made his screen debut in The Great Adventures of Captain Kidd.

Hayworth was married and divorced five times. She had affairs with several of her leading men, most notably with Victor Mature in 1942, during the filming of My Gal Sal.

She had two grandsons: Marc McKerrow by Rebecca Welles, who married and had children, and Andrew Ali Aga Khan Embiricos by Yasmin Aga Khan, who died unmarried.

Relationship with Glenn Ford
Hayworth also had a long-term on-and-off 40-year affair with Glenn Ford, which they started during the filming of Gilda in 1945. Their relationship is documented in the 2011 biography Glenn Ford: A Life by Ford's son, Peter Ford. Peter revealed in his book that his father got Hayworth pregnant during the filming of The Loves of Carmen; she travelled to France to get an abortion. Ford later moved next door to her in Beverly Hills in 1960, and they continued their relationship for many years until the early 1980s.

Spouses

Edward Charles Judson

In 1937, when Hayworth was 18, she married Edward C. Judson, an oilman turned promoter who was more than twice her age. They married in Las Vegas. He had played a major role in launching her acting career. A shrewd businessman, he was domineering and became her manager for months before he proposed. "He helped me with my career", Hayworth conceded after they divorced, "and helped himself to my money." She alleged that Judson compelled her to transfer a considerable amount of her property to him, and she promised to pay him $12,000 under threats that he would do her "great bodily harm".

She filed for divorce from him on February 24, 1942, with a complaint of cruelty. She noted to the press that his work took him to Oklahoma and Texas while she lived and worked in Hollywood. Judson was as old as her father, who was enraged by the marriage, which caused a rift between Hayworth and her parents until the divorce. Judson had failed to tell Hayworth before they married that he had previously been married twice. When she left him, she had no money; she asked her friend Hermes Pan if she could eat at his home.

Orson Welles

Hayworth married Orson Welles on September 7, 1943, during the run of The Mercury Wonder Show. None of her colleagues knew about the planned wedding (before a judge) until she announced it the day before. For the civil ceremony, she wore a beige suit, a ruffled white blouse, and a veil. A few hours after they got married, they returned to work at the studio. They had a daughter, Rebecca, who was born on December 17, 1944, and died at the age of 59 on October 17, 2004. They struggled in their marriage, with Hayworth saying that Welles did not want to be tied down:
During the entire period of our marriage, he showed no interest in establishing a home. When I suggested purchasing a home, he told me he didn't want the responsibility. Mr. Welles told me he never should have married in the first place; that it interfered with his freedom in his way of life.

On November 10, 1947, she was granted a divorce that became final the following year.

Prince Aly Khan

In 1948, Hayworth left her film career to marry Prince Aly Khan, a son of Sultan Mahommed Shah, Aga Khan III, the leader of the Ismaili community of Shia Islam. They were married on May 27, 1949. Her bridal trousseau was designed by Jacques Fath.

Aly Khan and his family were heavily involved in horse racing, owning and racing horses. Hayworth had no interest in the sport, but became a member of the Del Mar Thoroughbred Club anyway. Her filly, Double Rose, won several races in France and finished second in the 1949 Prix de l'Arc de Triomphe.

In 1951, while still married to Hayworth, Khan was spotted dancing with the actress Joan Fontaine in the nightclub where he and Hayworth had met. Hayworth threatened to divorce him in Reno, Nevada. In early May, Hayworth moved to Nevada to establish legal residence to qualify for a divorce. She stayed at Lake Tahoe with their daughter, saying there was a threat the child would be kidnapped. Hayworth filed for divorce from Khan on September 2, 1951, on the grounds of "extreme cruelty, entirely mental in nature".

Hayworth once said she might convert to Islam, but did not. During the custody fight over their daughter, Princess Yasmin Aga Khan, born , the prince said he wanted her to be raised as a Muslim; Hayworth wanted the child to be raised as a Christian. Hayworth rejected his offer of $1 million if she would rear Yasmin as a Muslim from age seven and allow her to go to Europe to visit with him for two or three months each year, stating:
Nothing will make me give up Yasmin's chance to live here in America among our precious freedoms and habits. While I respect the Moslem faith, and all other faiths, it is my earnest wish that my daughter be raised as a normal, healthy American girl in the Christian faith. There isn't any amount of money in the entire world for which it is worth sacrificing this child's privilege of living as a normal Christian girl here in the United States. There just isn't anything else in the world that can compare with her sacred chance to do that. And I'm going to give it to Yasmin regardless of what it costs.

In January 1953, Hayworth was granted a divorce from Aly Khan on the grounds of extreme mental cruelty. Her daughter Yasmin, only three years old, played about the court while the case was being heard, finally climbing on to the judge's lap.

Dick Haymes

When Hayworth and Dick Haymes first met, he was still married and his singing career was waning. When she showed up at the clubs, he got a larger audience. Haymes was desperate for money because two of his former wives were taking legal action against him for unpaid child support. His financial problems were so bad, he could not return to California without being arrested. On July 7, 1954, his ex-wife Nora Eddington got a bench warrant for his arrest, because he owed her $3,800 in alimony. Less than a week earlier, his other ex-wife, Joanne Dru, also got a bench warrant because she said he owed $4,800 in support payments for their three children. Hayworth ended up paying most of Haymes's debts.

Haymes was born in Argentina and did not have solid proof of American citizenship. Not long after he met Hayworth, U.S. officials initiated proceedings to have him deported to Argentina for being an illegal alien. He hoped Hayworth could influence the government and keep him in the United States. When she assumed responsibility for his citizenship, a bond was formed that led to marriage. The two were married on September 24, 1953, at the Sands Hotel, Las Vegas, and their wedding procession went through the casino.

From the start of their marriage, Haymes was deeply in debt to the Internal Revenue Service (IRS). When Hayworth took time off from attending his comeback performances in Philadelphia, the audiences sharply declined. Haymes's $5,000 weekly salary was attached by the IRS to pay a $100,000 bill, and he was unable to pay his pianist. Haymes's ex-wives demanded money while Hayworth publicly bemoaned her own lack of alimony from Aly Khan. At one point, the couple was effectively imprisoned in a hotel room for 24 hours in Manhattan at the Hotel Madison as sheriff's deputies waited outside threatening to arrest Haymes for outstanding debts. At the same time, Hayworth was fighting a severe custody battle with Khan, during which she reported death threats against their children. While living in New York, Hayworth sent the children to live with their nanny in Westchester County. They were found and photographed by a reporter from Confidential magazine.

After a tumultuous two years together, Haymes struck Hayworth in the face in 1955 in public at the Cocoanut Grove nightclub in Los Angeles. Hayworth packed her bags, walked out, and never returned. The assault and crisis shook her, and her doctor ordered her to remain in bed for several days.

Hayworth was short of money after her marriage to Haymes. She had failed to gain child support from Aly Khan. She sued Orson Welles for back payment of child support which she claimed had never been paid. This effort was unsuccessful and added to her stress.

James Hill

Hayworth began a relationship with film producer James Hill, whom she went on to marry on February 2, 1958. He put her in one of her last major films, Separate Tables. This film was popular and highly praised, although The Harvard Lampoon named her the worst actress of 1958 for her performance. On September 1, 1961, Hayworth filed for divorce, alleging extreme mental cruelty. Hill later wrote Rita Hayworth: A Memoir, in which he suggested that their marriage collapsed because he wanted Hayworth to continue making movies, while she wanted them both to retire from Hollywood.

In his autobiography, Charlton Heston wrote about Hayworth's brief marriage to Hill. One night, Heston and his wife Lydia joined the couple for dinner at a restaurant in Spain with the director George Marshall and the actor Rex Harrison, Hayworth's co-star in The Happy Thieves. Heston wrote that the occasion "turned into the single most embarrassing evening of my life", describing how Hill heaped "obscene abuse" on Hayworth until she was "reduced to a helpless flood of tears, her face buried in her hands". Heston wrote that the others sat stunned, witnesses to a "marital massacre", and, though he was "strongly tempted to slug him" (Hill), he left with his wife Lydia after she stood up, almost in tears. Heston wrote, "I'm ashamed of walking away from Miss Hayworth's humiliation. I never saw her again."

Health
 
Orson Welles noted Hayworth's problem with alcohol during their marriage, but he never believed that her problem was alcoholism. "It certainly imitated alcoholism in every superficial way", he recalled in 1983. "She'd fly into these rages, never at me, never once, always at Harry Cohn or her father or her mother or her brother. She would break all the furniture and she'd get in a car and I'd have to get in the car and try to control her. She'd drive up in the hills suicidally. Terrible, terrible nights. And I just saw this lovely girl destroying herself. I admire Yasmin so much."

Yasmin Aga Khan spoke of her mother's long struggle with alcohol:
I remember as a child that she had a drinking problem. She had difficulty coping with the ups and downs of the business ... As a child, I thought, 'She has a drinking problem, and she's an alcoholic.' That was very clear, and I thought, 'Well, there's not much I can do. I can just, sort of, stand by and watch.' It's very difficult, seeing your mother, going through her emotional problems and drinking and then behaving in that manner ... Her condition became quite bad. It worsened and she did have an alcoholic breakdown and landed in the hospital.

In 1972, the 54-year-old Hayworth wanted to retire from acting, but she needed money. At the suggestion of Robert Mitchum, she agreed to film The Wrath of God. The experience exposed her poor health and her worsening mental state. Because she could not remember her lines, her scenes were shot one line at a time. In November, she agreed to complete one more movie, the British film Tales That Witness Madness, but because of her worsening health, she left the set and returned to the United States. She never returned to acting.

In March 1974, both of her brothers died within a week of each other, which caused her great sadness and led to heavy drinking. In January 1976, at London's Heathrow Airport, Hayworth was removed from a TWA flight after having an angry outburst while traveling with her agent. The event attracted much negative publicity; a disturbing photograph was published in newspapers the next day. Hayworth's alcoholism hid symptoms of what was eventually understood to be Alzheimer's disease.

Yasmin Aga Khan spoke of her mother's disease:
It was the outbursts. She'd fly into a rage. I can't tell you. I thought it was alcoholismalcoholic dementia. We all thought that. The papers picked that up, of course. You can't imagine the relief just in getting a diagnosis. We had a name at last, Alzheimer's! Of course, that didn't really come until the last seven or eight years. She wasn't diagnosed as having Alzheimer's until 1980. There were two decades of hell before that.

Biographer Barbara Leaming wrote that Hayworth aged prematurely because of her addiction to alcohol and also because of the many stresses in her life. "Despite the artfully applied make-up and shoulder-length red hair, there was no concealing the ravages of drink and stress", she wrote of Hayworth's arrival in New York in May 1956 in order to begin work on Fire Down Below, her first film in three years. "Deep lines had crept around her eyes and mouth, and she appeared worn, exhaustedolder than her thirty-eight years."

Alzheimer's disease had been largely forgotten by the medical community since its discovery in 1906. Medical historian Barron H. Lerner wrote that when Hayworth's diagnosis was made public in 1981, she became "the first public face of Alzheimer's, helping to ensure that future patients did not go undiagnosed ... Unbeknownst to her, Hayworth helped to destigmatize a condition that can still embarrass victims and their families."

In July 1981, Hayworth's health had deteriorated to the point that a judge in Los Angeles Superior Court ruled that she should be placed under the care of her daughter, Princess Yasmin Aga Khan of New York City. Hayworth lived in an apartment at The San Remo on Central Park West adjoining that of her daughter, who arranged for her mother's care during her final years. When asked how her mother was doing, Yasmin replied, "She's still beautiful. But it's a shell."

In 1983, Rebecca Welles arranged to see her mother for the first time in seven years. Speaking to his lifelong friend Roger Hill, Orson Welles expressed his concern about the visit's effect on his daughter. "Rita barely knows me now", Welles said. He recalled seeing Hayworth three years before at an event which the Reagans held for Frank Sinatra. "When it was over, I came over to her table, and I saw that she was very beautiful, very reposed looking, and didn't know me at first. After about four minutes of speaking, I could see that she realized who I was, and she began to cry quietly."

In an interview which he gave the evening before his death in 1985, Welles called Hayworth "one of the dearest and sweetest women that ever lived".

Political views
Hayworth was a lifelong Democrat who was an active member of the Hollywood Democratic Committee and was active in the campaign of Franklin Delano Roosevelt during the 1944 presidential election.

Religion
Hayworth was a Catholic whose marriage to Prince Aly Khan was deemed "illicit" by Pope Pius XII.

Death

Rita Hayworth lapsed into a semicoma in February 1987. She died at age 68, from complications associated with Alzheimer's disease, on May 14, 1987 at her home in Manhattan. President Ronald Reagan, who was one of Hayworth's contemporaries in Hollywood, issued a statement:

Rita Hayworth was one of our country's most beloved stars. Glamorous and talented, she gave us many wonderful moments on stage and screen and delighted audiences from the time she was a young girl. In her later years, Rita became known for her struggle with Alzheimer's disease. Her courage and candor, and that of her family, were a great public service in bringing worldwide attention to a disease which we all hope will soon be cured. Nancy and I are saddened by Rita's death. She was a friend who we will miss. We extend our deep sympathy to her family.

A funeral service was held on May 18, 1987, at the Church of the Good Shepherd. Pallbearers included actors Ricardo Montalbán, Glenn Ford, Cesar Romero, Anthony Franciosa, choreographer Hermes Pan, and a family friend, Phillip Luchenbill. She was interred at Holy Cross Cemetery, Culver City. Her headstone includes Yasmin's sentiment: "To yesterday's companionship and tomorrow's reunion."

Filmography

Accolades

Hayworth received a Golden Globe nomination for Best Actress – Motion Picture Drama for her performance in Circus World (1964).

In 1978, at the Shoreham Hotel in Washington, D. C., Hayworth was presented with the inaugural National Screen Heritage Award of the National Film Society, a group that published American Classic Screen magazine (1976–1984).

In 1999, Hayworth was acknowledged as one of the top-25 greatest female stars of Classic Hollywood cinema in the American Film Institute's survey, AFI's 100 Years...100 Stars.

Legacy
The public disclosure and discussion of Hayworth's illness drew international attention to Alzheimer's disease, which was little known at the time, and it helped to greatly increase federal funding for Alzheimer's research.

The Rita Hayworth Gala, a benefit for the Alzheimer's Association, is held annually in Chicago and New York City. The program was founded in 1985 by Princess Yasmin Aga Khan, in honor of her mother. She is the hostess for the events and a major sponsor of Alzheimer's disease charities and awareness programs. , a total of more than $72 million had been raised through events in Chicago, New York, and Palm Beach, Florida.

On October 17, 2016, a press release from the Springer Associates Public Relations Agency announced that Rita Hayworth's former manager and friend, Budd Burton Moss, initiated a campaign to solicit the United States Postal Service to issue a commemorative stamp featuring Hayworth. Springer Associates also announced that the Academy of Motion Picture Arts and Sciences would be lobbied in hopes of having an honorary Academy Award issued in memory of Hayworth. The press release added that Hayworth's daughter, Princess Yasmin Aga Khan, the Alzheimer's Association of Greater Los Angeles, and numerous prominent personalities of stage and screen were supporting the Moss campaign. The press release stated the target date for fulfillment of the stamp and Academy Award to be on October 17, 2018, on what will be the centennial of Hayworth's birth.

Cultural references 

The film I Remember Better When I Paint (2009) describes how Hayworth took up painting while struggling with Alzheimer's.

In the Baptiste episode "Shell", Baptiste talks to Kim about Hayworth in an attempt to gain information from her about Natalie after noticing that she has several DVDs of Hayworth's films; the Dream Room has a poster of Gilda.

Hayworth's name can be heard on the Madonna hit from 1990 "Vogue", among other artists from classical Hollywood cinema. Her name is also mentioned in Tom Waits's song "Invitation to the Blues" from his 1976 album Small Change.

In the Sicilian scenes of the film The Godfather, the bodyguard of Michael Corleone is heard shouting the name "Rita Hayworth" to GI's passing by in jeeps.

Hayworth is the main topic of the song, "Take, Take, Take" by the White Stripes and also referenced in "White Moon"; both from their Get Behind Me Satan album, released in 2005. In a 2005 interview with Rolling Stone, Jack White says, "Rita Hayworth became an all-encompassing metaphor for everything I was thinking about while making the album."

The film The Shawshank Redemption was adapted from a Stephen King short story, "Rita Hayworth and Shawshank Redemption", a novella from his 1982 collection, Different Seasons. A poster of Rita Hayworth hides a hole in a jail cell wall in the novella, which was used for the first third of the film, then changed to a poster of Marilyn Monroe for the middle third, then Raquel Welch for the last third. In the film, there is a scene where the prison movie night shows Rita Hayworth's film Gilda.

References

Further reading
 McLean, Adrienne L (2004). Being Rita Hayworth: Labor, Identity, and Hollywood Stardom. .
 Peary, Gerald (1976). Rita Hayworth: A Pyramid Illustrated History of the Movies. .
 Ringgold, Gene (1974). The Films of Rita Hayworth: The Legend and Career of a Love Goddess. .
 Roberts-Frenzel, Caren (2001). Rita Hayworth: A Photographic Retrospective. .
 Moss, Budd Burton (2015). Hollywood: Sometimes the Reality is Better Than the Dream.

External links

 
 
 
 Photos of Rita Hayworth in Down to Earth by Ned Scott

1918 births
1987 deaths
20th-century American actresses
20th Century Studios contract players
Actresses from Los Angeles
Actresses from New York City
Alexander Hamilton High School (Los Angeles) alumni
American child actresses
American female dancers
American film actresses
American film producers
American musical theatre actresses
American people of English descent
American people of Irish descent
American people of Romani descent
American people of Spanish descent
American racehorse owners and breeders
American radio actresses
American stage actresses
American tap dancers
American television actresses
American women film producers
Burials at Holy Cross Cemetery, Culver City
Catholics from California
Catholics from New York (state)
Columbia Pictures contract players
Dancers from California
Dancers from New York (state)
Deaths from Alzheimer's disease
Hispanic and Latino American actresses
Romani actresses
Deaths from dementia in New York (state)
Musicians from Brooklyn
People from the San Fernando Valley
Princesses by marriage
Qajar dynasty
United Service Organizations entertainers
California Democrats
New York (state) Democrats
Cansino family